Bela belgica is an extinct species of sea snail, a marine gastropod mollusk in the family Mangeliidae.

Description
The length of the shell attains 15 mm, its diameter 4.6 mm.

Distribution
This extinct marine species was found in the Pliocene strata in Belgium.

References

 Van Regteren Altena CO., 1959. Notes on Turridae from the Plio-Pleistocene of the Netherlands. Basteria, 2 3 (1-2): 31-32.

External links
 Image of Bela belgica

belgica